Célio Taveira Filho (16 October 1940 – 29 May 2020) was a Brazilian footballer who played as a striker.

Club career
Born in Santos, Taveira played for Portuguesa Santista, Ponte Preta, Jabaquara, Vasco da Gama, Nacional, Corinthians and Operário. He scored 100 goals for Vasco, being the club's 16th top goalscorer. For Nacional he scored 22 goals in the Copa Libertadores, being the 3rd highest Brazilian goalscorer in the competition. He retired at the age of 32 after injuring his collarbone in a collision with Rivelino in training.

International career
He earned 3 caps for the Brazilian national team. He was the last player to be cut from the Brazil squad for the 1966 FIFA World Cup.

Later life and death
From the late 1970s he lived in João Pessoa, Paraíba, where he worked as a businessman (running a fruit export business) and radio sports commentator.

He died in hospital in João Pessoa on 29 May 2020, aged 79, from COVID-19, during the COVID-19 pandemic in Brazil. At the time of his death Taveira had four children, eight grandchildren and two great-grandchildren.

References

1940 births
2020 deaths
Brazilian footballers
Associação Atlética Portuguesa (Santos) players
Associação Atlética Ponte Preta players
Jabaquara Atlético Clube players
CR Vasco da Gama players
Club Nacional de Football players
Sport Club Corinthians Paulista players
Operário Futebol Clube (MS) players
Association football forwards
Brazilian expatriate footballers
Brazilian expatriate sportspeople in Uruguay
Expatriate footballers in Uruguay
Deaths from the COVID-19 pandemic in Paraíba
Brazil international footballers
Sportspeople from Santos, São Paulo